Der Struwwelpeter ("shock-headed Peter" or "Shaggy Peter") is an 1845 German children's book by Heinrich Hoffmann. It comprises ten illustrated and rhymed stories, mostly about children. Each has a clear moral that demonstrates the disastrous consequences of misbehavior in an exaggerated way. The title of the first story provides the title of the whole book. Der Struwwelpeter is one of the earliest books for children that combines visual and verbal narratives in a book format, and is considered a precursor to comic books.

Der Struwwelpeter is known for introducing the character of the Tailor (or Scissorman) to Western literature. Some researchers now see the stories in the book as illustrations of modern child mental disorders.

Background and publication history

Hoffmann wrote Struwwelpeter in reaction to the lack of good books for children. Intending to buy a picture book as a Christmas present for his three-year-old son, Hoffmann instead wrote and illustrated his own book. In 1845 he was persuaded by friends to publish the book anonymously as Lustige Geschichten und drollige Bilder mit 15 schön kolorierten Tafeln für Kinder von 3–6 Jahren ("funny stories and droll pictures with 15 beautifully coloured panels for children of 3–6 years"). The book was one of the first uses of chromolithography (a method of making multi-colored prints) in a children's book.

For the third edition, published in 1858, the title was changed to Struwwelpeter, the name of the character in the first story. The book became popular among children throughout Europe.

Struwwelpeter has been translated into several languages. In 1891 Mark Twain wrote his own translation of the book, but because of copyright issues Twain's "Slovenly Peter" was not published until 1935, 25 years after his death.

British twin illustrators Janet and Anne Grahame Johnstone provided new illustrations for an English translation published in 1950.

The stories

Struwwelpeter describes a boy who does not groom himself properly and is consequently unpopular.
Die Geschichte vom bösen Friederich ("The Story of Wicked Frederick"): A violent boy terrorizes animals and people. Eventually he is bitten by a dog, who goes on to eat the boy's food while Frederick is bedridden.
Die gar traurige Geschichte mit dem Feuerzeug ("The Very Sad Tale with the Matches"): A girl plays with matches, accidentally ignites herself and burns to death. Only her cats mourn her.
Die Geschichte von den schwarzen Buben ("The Story of the Inky Boys"): Nikolas (or "Agrippa" in some translations) catches three boys teasing a dark-skinned boy. To teach them a lesson, he dips them in black ink.
Die Geschichte von dem wilden Jäger ("The Story of the Wild Huntsman") is the only story not primarily focused on children. In it, a hare steals a hunter's musket and eyeglasses and begins to hunt the hunter. In the ensuing chaos, the hare's child is burned by hot coffee and the hunter jumps into a well.
Die Geschichte vom Daumenlutscher ("The Story of the Thumb-Sucker"): A mother warns her son Konrad not to suck his thumbs. However, when she goes out of the house he resumes his thumb-sucking, until a roving tailor appears and cuts off his thumbs with giant scissors.
Die Geschichte vom Suppen-Kaspar ("The Story of Soup-Kaspar") begins as Kaspar (or "Augustus" in some translations), a healthy, strong boy, proclaims that he will no longer eat his soup. Over the next five days, he wastes away and dies. The last illustration shown is of his grave, which has a soup tureen atop it.
Die Geschichte vom Zappel-Philipp ("The Story of Fidgety Philip"): A boy who won't sit still at dinner accidentally knocks all of the food onto the floor, to his parents' great displeasure.
Die Geschichte von Hans Guck-in-die-Luft ("The Story of Johnny Look-In-The-Air") concerns a boy who habitually fails to watch where he's walking. One day he walks into a river; he is soon rescued, but his briefcase drifts away.
Die Geschichte vom fliegenden Robert ("The Story of Flying Robert"): A boy goes outside during a storm. The wind catches his umbrella and lifts him high into the air. The story ends with the boy sailing into the distance.

Music, film, and stage adaptations
A British stage production of Shockheaded Peter, by Philip Carr and Nigel Playfair, with music by Walter Rubens, premiered at the Garrick Theatre in London on 26 December 1900, and played 41 performances. The title role was played by George Grossmith Jr., with Kate Bishop as Mamma and Kitty Loftus as Harriet. The piece returned to the Garrick the following year, again playing 41 performances from 14 December, this time with Lawrence Grossmith as Peter, Nina Boucicault as Harriet and 11-year-old Marie Lohr as "Child". In a revival at the Wimbledon Theatre in South London from 26 December 1929 Mamma was played in a limited run of matinees by Louie Pounds, with H. Scott Russell as Papa, Leslie Holland as Augustus and Rex London as Peter.

Geoffrey Shaw's Struwelpeter, produced in 1914, featured the song "Conrad Suck-a-Thumb" by Martin Shaw.

A ballet of Der Struwwelpeter with music composed by Norbert Schultze was produced in Germany before World War II.

A live action film based on the book was released in Germany in 1955. Directed by Fritz Genschow, in this adaptation there is a "happy" ending where the characters' bad deeds are reversed.

Little Suck-a-Thumb (1992) is a psychoanalytical interpretation of the infamous cautionary tale. The short film by writer/director David Kaplan stars Cork Hubbert and Evelyn Solann, with Jim Hilbert as the Great Tall Scissorman.

"The Misadventures of Stuwwelpeter" for tenor and piano (also orchestrated for chamber ensemble) was composed by Michael Schelle in 1991. Five of the stories are included in the original version with piano.  "Inky Boys" is included only in the chamber version.

Struwwelpeterlieder (1996) is a setting of three of the stories for soprano, viola and piano by American composer Lowell Liebermann.

German composer Kurt Hessenberg (a descendant of Hoffmann) arranged Der Struwwelpeter for children's choir (op. 49) later in his life.

Shockheaded Peter (1998) is a British musical by The Tiger Lillies. that combines elements of pantomime and puppetry with musical versions of the poems with the songs generally following the text. It won a number of British theatre awards in the years following its release.

Composer Kenneth Hesketh's 2000–1 work, Netsuke (from the Japanese miniature sculptures called netsuke) comprises five short movements inspired variously by Saint-Exupéry's Le Petit Prince, Struwwelpeter, and a poem by Walter de la Mare.

Comics adaptations 
German comics artist David Füleki has created a number of manga-style adaptions of Struwwelpeter:
 Struwwelpeter: Die Rückkehr (2009, Tokyopop)
 Struwwelpeter: Das große Buch der Störenfriede (2009, Tokyopop)
 Struwwelpeter in Japan (Free Comic Book Day comic; 2012, Delfinium Prints)

The Scissorman story is adapted into comics form by Sanya Glisic in The Graphic Canon, Volume 2, published in 2012.

Media influences

Literature 
English author Edward Harold Begbie's first published book, The Political Struwwelpeter (1898), is of British politics, with the British Lion is as Struwwelpeter, "bedraggled, with long, uncut claws."

Adolf Hitler was parodied as a Struwwelpeter caricature in 1941 in a book called Struwwelhitler, published in Britain under the pseudonym Dr. Schrecklichkeit (Dr. Horrors).

Jamie Rix said that the book inspired him to create Grizzly Tales for Gruesome Kids when his publisher asked him to write more short stories about rude children. His mother had given him the book as a child and the stories gave him nightmares. Rix wanted to create a similar series of books for his children's generation.

Der Fall Struwwelpeter ("The Struwwelpeter Case"), 1989, by Jörg M. Günther is a satirical treatment in which the various misdeeds in the story - both by the protagonists and their surroundings - are analyzed via the regulations of the German Strafgesetzbuch.

Comics 
German cartoonist F. K. Waechter's Anti-Struwwwelpeter (1970) is a parody of Der Struwwelpeter.

Music
The British post-punk band Shock Headed Peters, formed in 1982, took their name from the story.

References to health conditions
The author, Heinrich Hoffmann, worked as a physician and later on as psychiatrist. Some of his stories describe habits of children, which can be in extreme forms signs of mental disorders. Attention deficit hyperactivity disorder is called Zappel-Philip-Syndrom (Fidgety-Philip syndrome) colloquially in Germany. The story of the Suppen-Kaspar (Soup-Kaspar) is a case example of anorexia nervosa. Uncombable hair syndrome is also called Struwwelpeter syndrome, after the book title.

References

Further reading
Carpenter, Humphrey, and Mari Prichard. (1984). The Oxford Companion to Children's Literature. New York: Oxford University Press. 
 Thomann Inge. Russische Kritik an Stjopka-Rastrjopka: pro et contra // Struwwelpost. Herausgegeben vom Freundeskreis des Heinrich-Hoffmann-Museums. Frankfurt-am-Main. 2003 (№9)
 Thomann Inge. Russische Űbersetzungen des Struwwelpeter // Struwwelpost. Herausgegeben vom Freundeskreis des Heinrich-Hoffmann-Museums. Frankfurt-am-Main. 2007 (№13)

External links

 The English Struwwelpeter, or, Pretty stories and funny pictures, Internet Archive (Ebook and Texts Archive), including downloadable versions.

 Struwwelpeter-Museum in Frankfurt, Germany (German)
 

1845 books
German books
German children's literature
Fictional German people
Male characters in literature
Child characters in literature
Children's fiction books
Children's poetry books
Children's short stories
Narrative poems
Short stories adapted into plays
Short stories adapted into films
Literary characters introduced in 1845
1840s children's books
Picture books
19th-century poetry books